The 2022–23 season is the 118th in the history of FC Admira Wacker Mödling and their first season back in the second division. The club are participating in the Austrian Football Second League and the Austrian Cup.

Players

First team squad

Out on loan

Transfers

Pre-season and friendlies

Competitions

Overall record

Austrian Football Second League

League table

Results summary

Results by round

Matches 
The league fixtures were announced on 24 June 2022.

Austrian Cup

References

FC Admira Wacker Mödling seasons
Admira Wacker Mödling